Vardadzor  or Gulyatag is a village that is, de facto, in the Martakert Province of the breakaway Republic of Artsakh; de jure it is in the Tartar District of Azerbaijan, in the disputed region of Nagorno-Karabakh. The village has an ethnic Armenian-majority population, and also had an Armenian majority in 1989.

History 
During the Soviet period, the village was part of the Mardakert District of the Nagorno-Karabakh Autonomous Oblast.

Historical heritage sites 
Historical heritage sites in and around the village include the 12th/13th-century St. Joseph's Church, a 12th/13th-century cemetery, and the Melik-Alaverdyan Fortress built in 1799.

Economy and culture 
The population is mainly engaged in mining, agriculture, and animal husbandry. As of 2015, the village has a municipal building, a school, two shops, and a medical centre.

Demographics 
The village had 193 inhabitants in 2005, and 199 inhabitants in 2015.

References

External links 
 

Populated places in Martakert Province
Populated places in Tartar District